The AAA Indoor Championships was an annual indoor track and field competition organised by the Amateur Athletic Association of England. It was the foremost indoor domestic athletics event during its lifetime.

The event was first held in 1935, following the construction of an adequate venue in Wembley Arena in London for the 1934 British Empire Games. The first iteration of the competition lasted for five editions and featured around nine men's indoor track and field events and six for women. The onset of World War II meant the competition was not held in 1940. The second iteration of the competition began in 1962, returning to its Wembley venue. The championships had a long residency at RAF Cosford indoor arena from 1965 to 1991, then from 1992 to 2001 at the National Indoor Arena in Birmingham. The final few editions for held at the English Institute of Sport, Sheffield. The event ceased in 2006, being replaced by the UK Athletics-organised British Indoor Athletics Championships.

Though organised by the English governing body, it was open to all athletes from the United Kingdom, and also to overseas athletes. (Most of the foreign athletes who competed were Irish or UK-based.) It served as the de facto British Championships, given the absence of such a competition during its history. It was typically held over two days over a weekend in February.

It was among the earliest and most significant annual indoor track and field competitions, being preceded only by the AAU Indoor Track and Field Championships in the United States (established in 1907). The restarting of the AAA Indoor Championships in 1962 came alongside similar national developments elsewhere, including the German Indoor Championships in 1954 and Soviet Indoors in 1964. The European Athletics Indoor Championships became the first regular indoor international championship in 1966.

Events
The following athletics events featured as standard on the main AAA Championships programme:

 Sprint: 60 m, 200 m, 400 m
 Distance track events: 800 m, 1500 m, 3000 m
 Hurdles: 60 m hurdles
 Jumps: long jump, triple jump, high jump, pole vault
 Throws: shot put

Events were initially raced and measured in imperial distances, with the transition to metric occurring in 1968 for men and 1969 for women. A men's 2000 metres steeplechase was contested from 1967 to 1985. Combined track and field events were introduced in 1987 in the form of a men's octathlon and a women's pentathlon; the octathlon was amended to the international standard men's heptathlon in 1991. Racewalking briefly featured on the programme, with a men's and women's 3000 metres track walk happening from 1997 to 2002. A women's 1.5 mile walk was also held in 1966 and 1967. and a men's 1-mile walk in 1936. The non-standard 600-yard run was held for both men and women from 1962 to 1964.

In line with the international expansion of women's athletics programmes to match the men's, the 3000 metres for women was added in 1973, the triple jump was added in 1991 and the pole vault in 1994.

Editions

Most successful athletes by event

References

Defunct athletics competitions
Athletics competitions in England
Recurring sporting events established in 1935
National championships in the United Kingdom
National indoor athletics competitions
Defunct sports competitions in England
Recurring sporting events disestablished in 2006
1935 establishments in England
2006 disestablishments in England